Kuy-e Rowshan Shahr (also Romanized as Kūy-e Rowshan Shahr) is a village in Jey Rural District, in the Central District of Isfahan County, Isfahan Province, Iran. At the 2006 census, its population was 619, in 179 families.

References 

Populated places in Isfahan County